Charles Bronfman,  (born June 27, 1931) is a Canadian-American businessman and philanthropist and is a member of the Canadian Jewish Bronfman family. With an estimated net worth of $2.5 billion (as of 2021), Bronfman was ranked by Forbes as the 27th wealthiest Canadian and 1,249th in the world.

Biography 
Bronfman was born into a Jewish family in Montreal. He is the son of Samuel Bronfman and Saidye Rosner Bronfman. He has two older sisters, the art patron Baroness Aileen "Minda" Bronfman de Gunzberg, and architecture expert and developer Phyllis Lambert. His older brother, Edgar Bronfman, Sr., was his fellow co-chair of Seagram. Edgar Bronfman Jr. is Edgar's son. He was educated at Selwyn House School in Montreal, Trinity College School in Port Hope, Ontario, and McGill University. Bronfman said he is Canadian in his heart but sought his dual citizenship in order to vote in the United States.

Business career 
Bronfman held various positions in the family's liquor empire, Seagram, from 1951 to 2000. In 1951 Bronfman's father Samuel Bronfman gave Charles a 33% ownership stake in Cemp Investments, a holding company for him and his 3 siblings which controlled the family's corporate empire. Under the leadership of Charles and brother Edgar, it controlled billions of dollars in liquor, real estate, oil and gas, and chemical companies.

Bronfman and his brother, Edgar, inherited the Seagram spirits empire in 1971 after the death of their father, Sam Bronfman. Bronfman is a former co-chairman of the Seagram Company Ltd. On the demise of the company: "It was a disaster, it is a disaster, it will be a disaster," he says. "It was a family tragedy."

Bronfman was also well known for his forays into professional sports. He was majority owner of Major League Baseball's Montreal Expos from the team's formation in 1968 until 1991. He sold the franchise for $100 million CAD to a consortium of local investors led by Claude Brochu on November 29, 1990. The sale was completed  months later on June 14, 1991. In 1982, a day after the Montreal Alouettes of the Canadian Football League collapsed due to financial troubles, Bronfman bought their remains and used them to start a new franchise, the Montreal Concordes. This venture proved far less successful – despite later rebranding the team as the Alouettes, the team folded prior to the start of the 1987 CFL season.

Since 1986, he has served as chairman of The Andrea and Charles Bronfman Philanthropies, Inc. He planned to close the foundation in 2016.

From November 1997 until July 2002, Bronfman was the chairman of the board of Koor Industries Ltd., one of Israel's largest investment holding companies. He is the co-chairman of the McGill Institute for the Study of Canada. From 1999 to 2001, Bronfman was the first chairman of the United Jewish Communities, the merged North American organization comprising United Jewish Appeal, the Council of Jewish Federations and United Israel Appeal.

In April 2013, Bronfman was one of 100 prominent American Jews who sent a letter to Israeli Prime Minister Benjamin Netanyahu urging him to "work closely" with Secretary of State John Kerry "to devise pragmatic initiatives, consistent with Israel's security needs, which would represent Israel's readiness to make painful territorial sacrifices for the sake of peace."

Philanthropy 
He and Michael Steinhardt co-founded Taglit Birthright, a program which provides a free, educational travel experience to Israel for young Jewish adults. Bronfman is one of its principal donors. Since 1999, the program has sent more than 700,000 young Jews from around the world on a 10-day free trip to Israel.

In 1991, Bronfman with billionaire Leslie Wexner formed the "Mega Group", a loosely organized club of some the wealthiest and most influential businessmen who were concerned with Jewish issues. Max Fisher, Michael Steinhardt, Leonard Abramson, Edgar Bronfman Sr., and Laurence Tisch were some of the members. The "Mega Group" would meet twice a year for two days of seminars related to the topic of philanthropy and Jewishness. In 1998, Steven Spielberg spoke about his personal religious journey, and later the group discussed Jewish summer camps. The "Mega Group", went on to inspire a number of philanthropic initiatives such as the Partnership for Excellence in Jewish Education, Birthright Israel, and the upgrading of national Hillel.

Bronfman is chairman of the Andrea and Charles Bronfman Philanthropies Inc., a family of charitable foundations operating in Israel, the U.S., and Canada. Since its foundation in 1986, the charity spent more than $340 million to about 1,820 organizations. In 2016 Bonfman closed the charity, which was planned over years. Bronfman is also responsible for The Charles Bronfman Prize, honoring individuals for their humanitarian contributions. The first winner was Gift of Life Marrow Registry founder Jay Feinberg. He also founded the CRB Foundation, which runs educational enrichment classes in outlying areas in collaboration with the Education Ministry in Israel.

Bronfman was a founding co-chairman of Historica Canada, producers of the Heritage Minutes series of television shorts. It was at an early meeting of this foundation (originally the CAB Foundation) that he asked the members, "If television can use 30 seconds or 60 seconds to persuade people that Cadillacs or cornflakes are interesting, couldn't we also use that short piece of time to persuade Canadians that their history is interesting? You tell me how to do it, and I'll fund it." It was out of that discussion that the Heritage Minutes were conceived, piloted, distributed through cinemas and broadcasters across the country, and then confirmed as a major contribution of the foundation – which a few years later became Historica, recently merged with the Dominion Institute.

Bronfman joined the Giving Pledge, an initiative of the Bill & Melinda Gates Foundation.

Personal life 
Bronfman has been married four times:
 Barbara Baerwald (1938–2021). Married 1961, divorced 1982. They had two children.
 Stephen Bronfman runs the investment firm founded by his father, Claridge. He is married to Claudine Blondin.
 Ellen Bronfman Hauptman is married to Andrew Hauptman. They are the founders of the private investment firm Andell Holdings, the former owner of the Chicago Fire Soccer Club.
 Andrea "Andy" Brett Morrison (1945–2006). In 1982, she married Morrison; she died in 2006 after being struck by a taxi when she went out to walk her dog. She has three children from a previous marriage to Canadian manufacturer David Cohen, grandson of Lyon Cohen and cousin of singer Leonard Cohen: Jeremy Cohen, Pippa Cohen, and Tony Cohen.
 Bonita "Bonnie" Roche. In 2008, married Roche, an architect, in New York City. They divorced in 2011, on amicable terms, celebrating their divorce with a lavish "divorce party."
 Rita Mayo. They married in 2012.

Awards and honours 
 1981: Made an Officer of the Order of Canada
 1990: Doctorate of Philosophy, Honoris Causa awarded from Hebrew University of Jerusalem
 1990: Doctorate of Laws, Honoris Causa received from McGill University.
 1992: Member of the Queen's Privy Council for Canada.
 1992: Promoted to Companion of the Order of Canada
 1992: Doctorate of Humane Letters, Honoris Causa from Brandeis University
 1992: Doctorate of Laws, Honoris Causa from Concordia University
 1995: Doctorate of Laws, Honoris Causa from the University of Waterloo
 2000: Doctorate of Laws, Honoris Causa from the University of Toronto
 2002: Bronfman, along with his wife Andrea, were awarded Honorary Citizenship of Jerusalem
 2017: Doctor of Hebrew Letters, Honoris Causa from the Jewish Theological Seminary of America
2019: Honorary citizen, invited by the City of Montreal to sign the city's book of honour

Works or publications 
 Bronfman, Charles, and Jeffrey Solomon. The Art of Doing Good: Where Passion Meets Action. San Francisco: Jossey-Bass, 2012. 
 Bronfman, Charles, and Jeffrey Solomon. The Art of Giving: Where the Soul Meets a Business Plan. San Francisco, CA: Jossey-Bass, 2010. 
 Seagram Museum collection  at Hagley Museum and Library (finding aid)

References

External links 
 Charles Bronfman at The Canadian Encyclopedia
 Bronfman Family at The Canadian Encyclopedia

1931 births
Living people
Anglophone Quebec people
Charles Bronfman
Businesspeople from Montreal
Canadian Baseball Hall of Fame inductees
Canadian billionaires
Canadian people of Russian-Jewish descent
Canadian Zionists
Companions of the Order of Canada
American billionaires
American people of Russian-Jewish descent
American Zionists
Giving Pledgers
20th-century Canadian Jews
21st-century Canadian Jews
20th-century American Jews
21st-century American Jews
Naturalized citizens of the United States
21st-century philanthropists
Jewish Canadian philanthropists
Jewish American philanthropists
Major League Baseball owners
Members of the King's Privy Council for Canada
McGill University alumni
Montreal Alouettes owners
Montreal Expos owners